Nelson Johnston Barrientos (born 25 February 1990), is a Cuba professional footballer who plays as a goalkeeper for Honduran club C.D. Real Sociedad and the Cuba national team.

He debuted internationally in a friendly match against Nicaragua in a 3–1 defeat.

He appeared in the CONCACAF Nations League, the 2019 CONCACAF Gold Cup held in Costa Rica, Jamaica, and the United States, and last appeared the qualifying matches for the 2022 FIFA World Cup to be held in Qatar.

References

1990 births
Living people
Cuban footballers
Association football goalkeepers
FC Santiago de Cuba players
Cuban expatriate footballers
Cuban expatriate sportspeople in Honduras
Expatriate footballers in Honduras